Alex Antonitsch and Gilad Bloom were the defending champions, but did not participate this year.

Kevin Curren and Gary Muller won in the final 7–6, 6–4, against Kelly Evernden and Brad Pearce.

Seeds

  Kevin Curren /  Gary Muller (champions)
  John Fitzgerald /  Henrik Holm (first round)
  Neil Borwick /  Simon Youl (quarterfinals)
  Byron Black /  Byron Talbot (first round)

Draw

Draw

External links
Draw

Seoul Open
1992 ATP Tour
1992 Seoul Open